The 1977 Ahearne Cup was the 25th and final edition of the Ahearne Cup ice hockey tournament. Five teams participated in the tournament, which was won by Stockholm-based AIK. It was held from December 26–30, 1976, in Stockholm, Sweden.

Results

External links
Tournament on hockeyarchives.info

1977
1976–77 in Soviet ice hockey
1976–77 in Swedish ice hockey
1976–77 in Finnish ice hockey